Joshua Radin (born June 14, 1974) is an American singer-songwriter. He has recorded nine studio albums, and his songs have been used in a number of films and TV series. His most successful album, Simple Times, was released in 2008.

Beginnings
Joshua Radin was born and raised in Shaker Heights, Ohio, United States, to a Jewish family of Polish, German, Austrian, and Russian background. He studied drawing and painting at Northwestern University, following his college years with stints as an art teacher, screenwriter, and art gallery employee.

Radin turned to music when he moved to New York City, his father bought him a guitar, and he taught himself to play and write music.

In 2004, American actor Zach Braff, a friend of Radin since their days at Northwestern, introduced Radin's first composition, "Winter", to Scrubs show creator Bill Lawrence, who ultimately used several of Radin's songs in various scenes of the television series.

Musical career

According to Radin his musical career started in 2004, and he had learned to play the guitar only two years before that. His first song, "Winter", appeared on his debut album We Were Here. Since that time, Radin has been touring the United States, as well as much of the United Kingdom and Europe. Over the course of his career, Radin has shared stages with artists such as Sheryl Crow, Tori Amos, Imogen Heap, Meiko, Missy Higgins, Maria Taylor, Gary Jules, Amber Rubarth, Schuyler Fisk, The Script and many more. In addition to his American following, Radin has enjoyed success with his 2008 release, Simple Times in the United Kingdom. His song "I'd Rather Be With You" reached No. 11 on the UK Singles Chart and number two on the US Top Digital Chart.

We Were Here (2006) 

Radin has said that much of the album was inspired by a bad break-up. It was released exclusively to iTunes for a month, before attracting attention from major labels. Released on Columbia Records in May 2006, We Were Here presented the first batch of songs Radin ever wrote. The album drew critical acclaim and received a four-star review from Rolling Stone, who praised it for Radin's "whispery, silver-bell voice" and its themes, calling them "poignant and refreshingly frank." The record hit number one on the iTunes Folk Album Chart and included a number of well known musicians, including Ryan Adams who played guitar on the song "Lovely Tonight". Zach Braff hand-picked one of the tracks to be featured on the soundtrack for The Last Kiss.

Radin played the song "Today" from the album, along with five other songs, for Ellen DeGeneres and Portia de Rossi at their August 16, 2008, wedding.

Simple Times (2008) 
Radin's second album, Simple Times went straight to No. 1 on the iTunes overall chart upon its release. Radin enlisted highly regarded producer Rob Schnapf (Elliott Smith, Beck). The two spent seven weeks recording at L.A.'s legendary Sunset Sound Studio working with a cast of musicians that included guitarist Greg Leisz, bassist Johnny Flaugher, keyboardist Jason Borger, drummer Victor Indrizzo and percussionist Lenny Castro. Among the album's many highlights are "You Got Growin' Up To Do", featuring guest vocalist Patty Griffin, lead single "I'd Rather Be with You" and "Brand New Day". Tracks from the album were featured on TV shows such as Bones, Scrubs, House, Grey's Anatomy, One Tree Hill, Life Unexpected, 90210, Brothers and Sisters, American Idol and Australian hit series Packed to the Rafters among others. Radin's "Simple Times" was released on Mom + Pop Music.

The Rock and The Tide (2010) 
Radin's third studio album, The Rock and The Tide was released on October 12, 2010 on Mom + Pop Music, his second release with the label. The album reached number five on the iTunes albums chart upon its release. The Rock and The Tide was produced by Martin Terefe (Cat Stevens, Ron Sexmith). A later EP released in 2011 used 6 of the album's tacks recorded in an acoustic session.

Underwater (2012) 
On September 4, 2012, Radin released his fourth studio album, Underwater. The album was Radin's third release with Mom + Pop Music.

Radin wrote songs with Janet Devlin in the Autumn of 2012 for her debut album.

Wax Wings (2013) 
Joshua Radin's fifth studio album Wax Wings was released May 7, 2013. Wax Wings, a self-released album, has eleven tracks. Included on the album is the song "Lovely Tonight", which had been previously released on iTunes as a single. The tracks "In Her Eyes" and "Stay" were produced by Matt Noveskey.

Onward and Sideways (2015) 
Joshua Radin's released a sixth studio album on January 6, 2015. The album consisted of 13 tracks, one of which was a re-release of the Wax Wings track "Beautiful Day" recorded with Sheryl Crow.

The Fall (2017) 

Radin released a self-produced album titled The Fall on January 27, 2017 through Cadence Music.

Here, Right Now (2019) 
Radin's eighth studio album, Here, Right Now, was released on October 4, 2019 through Nettwerk Music Group. It was his first album with Nettwerk. Here, Right Now features a cover of Tom Petty's I Won't Back Down.

The Ghost and The Wall (2021) 
Joshua Radin's ninth full-length album, The Ghost and The Wall, was released on July 23, 2021. Radin wrote The Ghost and The Wall at his home in Los Angeles in 2020, in isolation during the early days of the Covid-19 pandemic. The album was produced remotely via email and text messages with Jonathan Wilson, who also played several instruments on the album. The two musicians have never met in person.

Personal life
Joshua Radin attended Northwestern University, where he met and became friends with Zach Braff.

Radin became a favorite singer of the American TV host Ellen DeGeneres and he has appeared on several of her shows. DeGeneres invited Radin to sing his composition "Today", a favorite song of hers, at her wedding with Portia de Rossi.

Radin also wrote the song "In Her Eyes" in celebration of his own sister's wedding.

In addition to his love of music, Radin is an avid traveler.

Philanthropy
Radin has been involved with Little Kids Rock, a national nonprofit that provides music education to schools without music programs. Radin visited schools in six cities during his 2011 tour in support of The Rock and the Tide to give guitar lessons on the song "Brand New Day", and brought some of the students on stage at his concerts to perform the song with him. He did so again in 2015 for his song "Beautiful Day".

Radin also supports the North Shore Animal League as a celebrity ambassador, donating 100% of the proceeds from his single, "Here, Right Now", to the New York based animal rescue organization.

Television and movies
Radin's songs have been used on television series such as Designated Survivor, Scrubs, Grey's Anatomy, Brothers and Sisters, American Idol, Cougar Town, One Tree Hill, House, Shameless, among others. Radin also made a cameo appearance in Cougar Towns 4th-season finale. As of September 2010, he had amassed more than 75 film and television placements of his songs.

Discography

Studio albums

Live albums
Live from the Village (2016)

EPs
First Between 3rd and 4th (2004)
Live Session (iTunes Exclusive EP) (2006)
Unclear Sky (iTunes Exclusive EP) (2008)
Simple Times – Bonus Material (Demos) EP (2009)
Songs Under a Streetlight EP (2010)
The Rock and the Tide (Acoustic Session) EP (2011)
Covers, Vol. 1 EP (2020)
 though the world will tell me so, vol. 1 (2023)

Singles

Others
2016: "Belong" (with Måns Zelmerlöw)

Compilation appearances
 His Way, Our Way'' (Frank Sinatra tribute album)

References

External links

Review of One of Those Days at Daily Music Guide

Video links
  Joshua Radin – Winter, and other songs

Singer-songwriters from Ohio
21st-century American male singers
21st-century American singers
Musicians from Shaker Heights, Ohio
Living people
Northwestern University alumni
American rock songwriters
American rock singers
American acoustic guitarists
American male guitarists
American folk rock musicians
American folk guitarists
American people of German-Jewish descent
American people of Polish-Jewish descent
American people of Russian-Jewish descent
American people of Austrian-Jewish descent
1974 births
Jewish American musicians
Jewish rock musicians
Jewish folk singers
21st-century American guitarists
Guitarists from Ohio
Mom + Pop Music artists
21st-century American Jews
American male singer-songwriters